Henuttawy D was an ancient Egyptian high priestess, a God's Wife of Amun, during the 21st Dynasty.

Biography

Her father was Pinedjem II, High Priest of Amun, her mother was Isetemkheb D, Singer of Amun. Both her parents were children of the high priest Menkheperre who was brother to Maatkare Mutemhat, the God's Wife preceding Henuttawy.

Henuttawy is known only from a few ushabtis. She was followed as God's Wife by Karomama Meritmut.

References

God's Wives of Amun
People of the Twenty-first Dynasty of Egypt
10th-century BC clergy
10th-century BC Egyptian women